The 43rd German Skeleton Championship in 2009 was organized on 15 November 2008 in Winterberg.

Men

Women

External links 
 Official results

Skeleton championships in Germany
2009 in German sport
2009 in skeleton